Stephen P Groff is an economist and Governor of the National Development Fund of Saudi Arabia.

Groff was appointed as Governor of the National Development Fund (NDF) in February, 2019. He is responsible for establishing this new government entity that aims to raise the level of performance of sectoral funds and development banks in Saudi Arabia.

He was previously ranking vice-president of the Asian Development Bank (ADB) in Manila, Philippines. At ADB he was responsible for operations in East Asia, Southeast Asia, and the Pacific, amounting to over $6 billion in new lending every year and a portfolio of $35 billion.

Education
Groff was raised in Warren, Vermont, and graduated from Harwood Union High School He is a 1986 graduate of Yale University, and attended the Kennedy School at Harvard University, receiving a two-year Master in Public Administration in 1996. He received the Pearson–FT Non-Executive Director SRF BTEC Level 7 diploma in 2015.

Career
In February, 2019, Groff became Governor of the National Development Fund (NDF). NDF was established to enhance economic diversification as well as to promote sustainable development financing in Saudi Arabia. NDF oversees different Saudi development funds and banks, supervises their performance and efficiency, and ensures that each entity contributes effectively to Saudi Vision 2030.

Groff was appointed as vice president of the Asian Development Bank (ADB) in September 2011. Previously, he served as Deputy Director for Development Cooperation at the Paris-based Organisation for Economic Co-operation and Development and as Deputy Vice-President for Operations at the Washington-based Millennium Challenge Corporation. He has also worked for the U.S. Agency for International Development, the U.S. Refugee Program and as a U.S. Peace Corps volunteer.

Groff serves on a number of advisory boards, including the Millennium Challenge Corporation, World Learning, Bretton Woods Committee,  Marine Stewardship Council, Institute for Sustainable Communities and the Global Footprint Network.

Groff also writes regularly on a variety of climate change and development-related issues, including Project Syndicate, The Wall Street Journal, The Guardian and The Huffington Post.

In 2018, Groff was identified by Richtopia as one of the top 100 leaders from multilateral organizations.

Personal life
Groff is married has two children. His family has lived in Vermont for generations and their roots there can be traced back to the 18th century. His Great-grandfather was the photographer Edmund Homer Royce of St. Albans. His 3rd Great-grandfather was Vermont Congressman and Chief Justice Homer Elihu Royce and his 4th Great-uncle was Vermont Governor and Chief Justice Stephen Royce. His 5th Great-grandfather was Major Steven Royce who was a delegate to the convention that signed the 1774 Dorset Accords which led to an independent Vermont Republic and future statehood. Groff speaks Tagalog and French and is a triathlete.

Selected publications
China’s City Clusters: Pioneering Future Mega-Urban Governance. American Affairs - May 21, 2019.
To Resist the Robots, Invest in People. Project Syndicate - January 2, 2018.
A buffer against protectionism. Boao Review - April 3, 2017.
Climate Change Challenges for Vermont. VT Digger - March 19, 2017.
An Infrastructure Crisis? Huffington Post - March 3, 2017.
The Next Migrant Wave. Project Syndicate - December 29, 2016.
How Will ASEAN Members Cope with Their Climate Change Challenge? Knowledge Wharton - March 10, 2016.
Putting out Indonesia’s Fires. Project Syndicate - December 4, 2015.
Overcoming Southeast Asia’s Barriers to Trade. The Wall Street Journal - June 30, 2015.
Shifting the Gear toward Green Growth. People's Daily - October 17, 2014.
Asean's Infrastructure Crisis. The Wall Street Journal - July 28, 2014.
This Time We Must All Be Filipino. The Philippine Daily Inquirer - November 30, 2013.
Why investing in Myanmar matters. The Hill - October 8, 2012.
Will this be the 'Asian century'? The Guardian - April 18, 2012.
The Peace Corps: Is Fifty Years Enough? The Huffington Post - August 28, 2011.
Fund the fight against global poverty. The Christian Science Monitor - October 3, 2008.

References

21st-century American economists
Harvard Kennedy School alumni
1964 births
Living people
Yale University alumni